Macy's East, New York City, New York was a division of Macy's, Inc.  It was the operating successor to the original R.H. Macy & Co., Inc. and operates the Macy's department stores in the northeast U.S. and Puerto Rico.  Over the years it has been known as Macy's New York and Macy's Northeast.  On February 1, 2006, Macy's East assumed operating control over the Filene's, Strawbridge's, many of the Kaufmann's stores in upstate New York and the Hecht's stores in Pennsylvania, Maryland, D.C. and northern Virginia.  These locations assumed the Macy's moniker officially on September 9, 2006. In 2008, Macy's East merged with Macy's North. On February 2, 2009, Macy's Inc. announced plans to consolidate all Macy's divisions into a single division based in New York. Then Macy's West was also consolidated into Macy's East during the second quarter of 2009. Macy's East was then merged into Macy's Inc.

Macy's East predecessors
 Gertz Co., Jamaica, New York, merged into Stern's 1982, stores renamed 1983.
 The William Hengerer Co., Buffalo, New York, merged into Sibley's 1982.
 Bamberger's, Newark, New Jersey, merged into Macy's 1986.
 D.M. Read Co., Bridgeport, Connecticut, merged into Jordan Marsh 1987.
 M. O'Neil Co. (part, divided between Macy's North and Macy's Midwest), Akron, Ohio, merged into May Co. 1989.
 May Company (part, divided between Macy's North and Macy's Midwest), Cleveland, Ohio, merged into Kaufmann's 1993.
 G. Fox & Co., Hartford, Connecticut, merged into Filene's 1993.
 Sibley, Lindsay & Curr Co., Rochester, New York, merged into Kaufmann's 1993.
 Abraham & Straus, Brooklyn, New York, merged into Macy's 1995.
 John Wanamaker, Philadelphia, Pennsylvania, merged into Hecht's 1995 and Strawbridge's 1998.
 Jordan Marsh & Co., Boston, Massachusetts, merged into Macy's 1996.
 Stern Brothers, Paramus, New Jersey (founded in Manhattan), merged into Macy's 2001.
 William Filene's Sons' Co., Boston, Massachusetts, merged into Macy's 2006.
 Strawbridge & Clothier Co., Philadelphia, Pennsylvania, merged into Macy's 2006.
 The Hecht Co. (part, divided between Macy's East and Macy's South), Washington, D.C., merged into Macy's 2006.
 Marshall Field & Company, Chicago, Illinois, converted to Macys 2006. 
 Kaufmann Brothers (part, divided between Macy's North and Macy's Midwest),  Pittsburgh, Pennsylvania, merged into Macy's 2006.

See also
 Macy's West
 Macy's Inc.

References

Macy's
1992 establishments in the United States